Sweden chose their entrants, The Ark, with the song "The Worrying Kind" for the Eurovision Song Contest 2007.

Before Eurovision

Melodifestivalen 2007 

Sweden used a national final, Melodifestivalen 2007, which consisted of four heats on February 3, February 10, February 17, February 24; a second chance round on March 3; and the final which took place on March 10. The method of selection remained the same as previous years with 4 heats consisting of 8 songs each, with the 2 top-placing entries securing spots for the final and the 3rd and 4th place entries earning spots in the Second Chance round. The Second Chance round was live this year with competitors going up against each other for the last two spots in the final, facing off in a bracket-based tournament. All six shows were hosted by Kristian Luuk.

Some familiar faces returned to Melodifestivalen this year, among them Eurovision 1989 representative Tommy Nilsson, 1966 representative Svante Thuresson, 2003 representative Jessica Andersson, and 1996 representative Nanne Grönvall. Andreas Lundstedt also competed at Eurovision in 2006 for Switzerland.

Final 
The final was held at the Globe Arena in Stockholm on 10 March 2007. The winner was chosen by 11 regional juries (50%) and televoting (50%).

At Eurovision
Sweden automatically qualified to the grand final, because it was on the top 10 last year. In the grand final, performed 12th in the running order, following Georgia and preceding France, and finished 18th with 51 points.

Voting

Points awarded to Sweden

Points awarded by Sweden

References

2007
Countries in the Eurovision Song Contest 2007
Eurovision
Eurovision